The Bay of Txingudi is a bay in the right or French bank of the estuary of the Bidasoa river, near Hendaye in the département of Pyrénées-Atlantiques in south-west France. It faces the town of Hondarribia and the airport of San Sebastián in the Gipuzkoa province of the Basque Country, in north-eastern Spain. The border between the two countries passes through the Bidasoa estuary. It is an important area for bird-watching.

The name may, by extension, be applied to the whole body of water between the French and Spanish sides. The coastal marshes on the Spanish side have been designated as a protected Ramsar site since 2002.

References 

Landforms of Pyrénées-Atlantiques
Gipuzkoa
Bays of Metropolitan France
Ramsar sites in Spain